The Ambrosini SAI.10 Grifone ("Griffon") was a military trainer aircraft produced in small numbers for the Italian Regia Aeronautica early in World War II.

History
With the approach of war, the Ministero dell' Aeronautica began a programme to increase the number of pilots available, and ordered a prototype primary trainer from Ambrosini. This aircraft, a parasol monoplane of mixed construction, first flew on July 8, 1939, with Guiliano Ferrari at the controls.  A production batch of 50 was ordered, but this was quickly reduced to just 10 machines, all of which were delivered in 1940.

Variants
Production aircraft differed by having a Fiat A.50 radial engine in place of the prototype's CNA D.  Other engine fits that were tried included an example with a Siemens-Halske Sh 14, and one with an Alfa Romeo 110; this latter machine was designated SAI.11.  Another experimental development that did not enter production was a float-equipped SAI.10 Gabbiano ("Seagull").

Operators

Regia Aeronautica

Specifications

References

  
 
 

SAI Ambrosini aircraft
Parasol-wing aircraft
1930s Italian military trainer aircraft
Single-engined tractor aircraft
Aircraft first flown in 1939